"I Don't Need Your Love" is a 2018 song by Bleona.

I Don't Need Your Love, Don't Need Your Love, Don't Need Love or variants may also refer to:

I Don't Need Your Love
 "I Don't Need Your Love", from the musical Six (musical)
 "I Don't Need Your Love Anymore", 1963 song by Dobby Dobson
 "I Don't Need Your Love Anymore", 2001 cover by The Specials from the album Conquering Ruler
 "I Don't Need Your Love", 1964 song by The Wailers
 "I Don't Need Your Love", 1974 song by Fancy (band)
 "I Don't Need Your Love", 1977 song by Skrewdriver from the album All Skrewed Up
 "I Don't Need Your Love", 1982 song by The Sequence
 "I Don't Need Your Love Now", 1984 song by The Mood
 "I Don't Need Your Love", 1987 song by Jerry Calliste Jr. (also known as Hashim)
 "I Don't Need Your Love", 1986 song by Grave Digger from Stronger Than Ever (album)
 "I Don't Need Your Love", 2004 song by Aereogramme from Seclusion (Aereogramme album)
 "I Don't Need Your Love Song", 2009 song by Sarah Dawn Finer from Moving On (Sarah Dawn Finer album)
 I Don't Need Your Love, an album by Clones of Clones
 "I Don't Need Your Love", 2014 title track song from that album
 "I Don't Need Your Love", 2014 song by Brody Dalle from the album Diploid Love

Don't Need Your Love
 "Don't Need Your Love", 2005 song by The Game from the album The Documentary
 "Don't Need Your Love", 2018 song by Ash from Islands (Ash album)
 "Don't Need Your Love", 2019 song by Hrvy and NCT Dream

Don't Need Love
 "Don't Need Love" (Johnny Diesel and the Injectors song), 1988 song and debut single by Australian rock group, Johnny Diesel and the Injectors
 "Don't Need Love", 2015 song by Katharine McPhee from her album Hysteria
 "Don't Need Love" (220 Kid and Gracey song), 2020 single by 220 Kid and Gracey